Avant Browser is a discontinued freeware web browser from a Chinese programmer named Anderson Che with the browser engines Trident, Gecko and Webkit  the user can switch between. It runs on Windows 2000 and above, including Windows 8, Windows 8.1 and Windows 10. Internet Explorer versions 6 through 11 are supported.

History and development

Avant Browser was largely inspired by Opera, the first major browser to have a multiple document interface. The developer's objective was to wrap a comparable interface around the layout engine used by Internet Explorer, thereby achieving Opera-like ergonomics without suffering the frequent problems that browser had rendering pages tested only in Internet Explorer. In fact, it was initially released under the name "IEopera", though this was soon changed due to trademark concerns.

Later, Avant's developer, Anderson Che, has concentrated on adding user-requested features, and Avant was among the first browsers to have popup blocking, advertising server blocking, and one-click disabling of potential security vulnerabilities such as ActiveX, Java and JavaScript.

The Avant Browser's default search engine is a version of the Yahoo! search engine renamed Avantfind and is given a custom look. Other search engines are available via the address bar's "Quick Search" facility, and instructions on how to change the default to an engine of the user's choice have been posted by the very active Avant Browser user community.

The community has also created other tools and extensions for Avant, including registry files which allow it to use the Information Bar and other security enhancements of Windows XP SP2.

The developer also used to have a sister project known as Orca Browser, an Avant-like shell of Mozilla's Gecko layout engine as used in Firefox 3 using similar approaches to Flock. Orca Browser project is now discontinued. Gecko layout engine was included in Avant Browser version 2012 Ultimate edition, alongside the traditional Trident layout engine.

Avant was one of the twelve browsers offered to European Economic Area users of Microsoft Windows in 2010.

Avant Browser 11
Avant Browser 11 (build 130 released on January 26, 2011) includes support for many toolbars that are compatible with Internet Explorer, a facility for users to create their own scripted toolbar buttons, and a password and form-filling wizard. 

A native bookmark system was also added n place of sharing Internet Explorer's Favorites. These bookmarks may be stored online with feeds, autofills, and browser settings.
This allows the user to synchronize any number of Avant installations on different computers. Avant can still share Internet Explorer's Favorites. This option was reintroduced by the developer after some users lamented its loss.

Another innovation is that Avant may now be run from a USB flash drive (or other portable storage device such as an MP3 player) without needing to be installed. In conjunction with Avant's session saving facility, this allows the user to halt a browsing session on one PC, move to another and resume viewing the same web pages.

Avant Browser 2012
Avant Browser 2012 Ultimate edition (build 3 released on October 25, 2011) added the Gecko layout engine (the rendering engine used by Mozilla Firefox), and the most recent release (build 168 released on April 6, 2012) also included the WebKit layout engine (the rendering engine used by Safari), making Avant Browser a three-engine browser. Layout engine is selectable by the user.

There is also a lite edition which contains only the Trident layout engine.

Features

Avant allows users to synchronize their bookmark, feed and setting storage. There is a portable version that can be used without installation. It uses a low amount of resources due to all pages running in a single process and is compatible with many Internet Explorer toolbars and add-ins, including Google toolbar. Further it has an RSS reader, 21 themes to change its appearance, a translation feature, supports proxy servers, white and blacklists for domains such as advertisement servers and an option to quickly block unwanted page elements.

It supports 15 languages.

See also
 List of web browsers
 Comparison of web browsers
 Internet Explorer shell browsers
 List of feed aggregators
 Comparison of feed aggregators

References

External links
 

Windows web browsers
Internet Explorer shells
Portable software
2004 software
News aggregator software